Drasteria fumosa, the smoky arches, is a species of moth in the family Erebidae first described by Strecker in 1898. It is found from the US state of California east to Utah and Texas.

The wingspan is 34–43 mm. Adults are on wing in summer.

References

External links

Drasteria
Moths described in 1898
Moths of North America